Bagababoy is an island located in the Philippine island Province of Masbate. In 1919 it was described as wooded and "steep-to." The western side of the island has high cliffs.

See also

 List of islands of the Philippines

References

Islands of Masbate